The 1968 United States presidential election in Alabama was held on November 5, 1968.

Southern segregationist candidate George Wallace, the former Governor of Alabama running as a third party candidate with his American Independent Party, won his home state in a landslide. Wallace received the official Democratic Party ballot line in Alabama, while national Democratic Party nominee Hubert Humphrey was forced to run on a fusion ticket of "Alabama Independent Democrat" and the National Democratic party ballot line.

In Alabama, voters voted for electors individually instead of as a slate, as in the other 49 states.

Wallace won 65.86% to Democrat Hubert Humphrey's 18.72%, a 47.13% margin. Republican Richard Nixon, while winning the election nationally, finished a distant third in Alabama with only 13.99%, receiving significant support only in a few northern counties with historically significant GOP votes, and in higher-income urban areas. Wallace's 65.86% of the popular vote would make Alabama not only his best performing state in the 1968 election, but the strongest performing state out of any candidate, with only Washington D.C. being stronger.

Wallace won 64 of the state's 67 counties. As African-Americans in the South were slowly gaining the right to vote as a result of federal civil rights legislation passed in 1964 and 1965, Wallace's weakest region was Alabama's Black Belt, where he won most counties with narrow majorities or pluralities. He lost three counties in this region, Sumter County, Greene County, and Macon County, all with majority black populations, to pro-civil rights candidate Hubert Humphrey. In black-majority Macon County, pro-civil rights Democrat Hubert Humphrey won a commanding landslide, taking 69.7% of the vote to Wallace's 25.4%, reflecting the deep divide between the state's white and black voter populations. , this is the last election in which Mobile County, Shelby County, Baldwin County, Lee County, and Houston County were not carried by the Republican candidate, the last election in which the Republican candidate won the election without Alabama and the last election in which Wilcox County, Lowndes County, and Bullock County were not carried by the national Democratic candidate.

Results

Results by county

See also
United States presidential elections in Alabama

Notes

References

See also 

Alabama
1968
1968 Alabama elections